Zephir may refer to:

 a fictional character associated with Babar the Elephant
 Thierry Zéphir (born 19??), French author and curator

Vehicles and transportation
 Fouga Zéphir, a French carrier jet trainer 
 Piel Zephir, a French racing airplane
 D-ARUN Zephir, a Lufthansa airliner, see Dornier Do 18
 French frigate Zéphir (1706), see List of French sail frigates
 German torpedo boat Zephir, see List of naval ships of Germany
 rail-road shunting vehicles manufacturer, see Rail car mover 

Other
 Zephir (programming language), a programming language based on PHP and C
 A Laser Doppler anemometer called ZephIR developed by QinetiQ and licensed to a Renewable Energy consultancy called Natural Power

See also 
 Zephyr (disambiguation)
 Zefir (disambiguation)